Cumberland Land District is one of the twenty land districts of Tasmania which are part of the cadastral divisions of Tasmania. It was formerly one of the 18 counties of Tasmania. It is bordered by the River Derwent to the south, the Clyde River to the east, with Lake Sorell at the north-eastern edge. The Nive River is the boundary to the west. Part of the Shannon River is a section of the boundary to the north, with Great Lake on the northern edge.

The original parishes
On 15 January 1836 George Arthur, the Lieutenant Governor of the Island of Van Diemen's Land
proclaimed, via The Hobart Town Courier, the first counties and parishes to be surveyed in the colony.
 
The County of Cumberland, bounded on the north by the county of Westmoreland ; on the east by the river Clyde ; on the west by a portion of the river Nive to its confluence with the river Derwent; on the southwest by the river Derwent from its confluence with the river Nive to its confluence with the river Clyde.

Hundreds and parishes proclaimed at this time were:
 The hundred of Lawrenny
Lawrenny parish
Guilford
Abergavenny
Amhurst
The hundred of Ebrington
Fortescue
Saint Albans
Malmsbury
Rochford

The townships of Neville, Ebrington, Burford and Rochford were proclaimed as being within the county.

References

Land Districts of Tasmania